This list of works by Rafael Viñoly categorizes the Uruguayan architect's work.

Completed

, Libertador 442, Retiro, Buenos Aires, 1983
Physical Education Facility, Lehman College, Bronx, New York, 1994
Tokyo International Forum, Tokyo, Japan, 1996
Bronx Housing Court, Bronx, New York, 1997
Princeton Stadium, Princeton University, Princeton, New Jersey, 1998
Jongno Tower in Seoul, South Korea, 1999
Lamont–Doherty Earth Observatory, Columbia University, Palisades, New York, 2000
The Kimmel Center for the Performing Arts, Philadelphia, Pennsylvania, 2001
Van Andel Institute, Grand Rapids, Michigan, 2002
Watson Institute for International Studies, Brown University, Providence, Rhode Island, 2002
Viñoly Tower, Gelly 3690, Palermo, Buenos Aires, 2002 
Westgate Building, Pennsylvania State University, University Park, Pennsylvania, 2003
David L. Lawrence Convention Center, Pittsburgh, Pennsylvania, 2003
Carl Icahn Laboratory, Lewis Sigler Institute for Integrative Genomics, Princeton University, Princeton, New Jersey, 2004
University of Chicago Booth School of Business, Chicago, Illinois, 2004
Boston Convention and Exhibition Center, Boston, Massachusetts, 2004
National Institutes of Health, John Edward Porter Neurosciences Research Center, Bethesda, Maryland, 2004
Jazz at Lincoln Center, New York, New York, 2004
Nasher Museum of Art, Duke University, Durham, North Carolina, 2005
Mahler 4 Office Tower, Amsterdam, Netherlands, 2005
Howard Hughes Medical Institute, Janelia Farm Research Campus, Ashburn, Virginia, 2006
Wageningen University and Research Centre, Atlas Building, Wageningen, Netherlands, 2006
Gabrielle H. Reem and Herbert J. Kayden Center for Science and Computation, Bard College, Annandale-on-Hudson, New York, 2007
Bronx County Hall of Justice, Bronx, New York, 2007
California NanoSystems Institute, University of California Los Angeles, Los Angeles, California, 2007
Curve, Leicester, England, 2008
Fortabat Museum, Olga Cossettini 141, Puerto Madero, Buenos Aires, 2008
Brooklyn Children's Museum, Brooklyn, N.Y., 2008 (expansion)
Edificio Acqua, Punta del Este, Uruguay, 2008 
Helen Diller Family Cancer Research Building, University of California, San Francisco, San Francisco, California, 2008
Perelman Center for Advanced Medicine, University of Pennsylvania Health System, Philadelphia, Pennsylvania, 2008
New Terminal at Carrasco International Airport, Montevideo, Uruguay, 2009
West Quad Building, Brooklyn College, Brooklyn, N.Y.,2009
City College of New York Spitzer School of Architecture, Urban Design, and Landscape Architecture, New York City, 2009
Vdara Hotel & Spa at CityCenter, Paradise, Nevada, 2009

Institute for Regeneration Medicine Building, University of California San Francisco, San Francisco, California, 2010
The Gateway, Al Raha Beach Development, Abu Dhabi, UAE, 2010
South Texas Research Facility, University of Texas Health Science Center at San Antonio, San Antonio, Texas, 2010
Firstsite:newsite Colchester Visual Arts Facility, Colchester, England, 25 September 2011
University of Arizona Science Center, Tucson, Arizona, 2011
Claremont McKenna College, Kravis Center, Claremont, California, 2011
Madero Office Tower, Cecilia Grierson 355, Puerto Madero, Buenos Aires, 2011
University of Chicago Medicine Center for Care and Discovery, Chicago, Illinois, 2012
Mina Zayed Waterfront Development, Abu Dhabi, UAE, 2012
University of Oxford Master Plan and Mathematics Institute, Oxford, England, 2013
121st Police Precinct Stationhouse, Staten Island, New York 2013
Cleveland Museum of Art, Cleveland, Ohio, 2013 (expansion)
Novartis Building 3, East Hanover, New Jersey, 2013
20 Fenchurch Street, London, England, 2014
432 Park Avenue, New York, New York, 2015
Laguna Garzón Bridge, Uruguay, 2015
Cero+Infinito, Faculty of Exact and Natural Sciences, Ciudad Universitaria, Buenos Aires, 2019
Battersea Power Station Master Plan, London, England, 2020
The Bryanston, London, England, 2020

In progress

Edward M. Kennedy Institute for the United States Senate, Boston, Massachusetts, 2014
Henry A. Jordan Medical Education Center, Perelman School of Medicine, University of Pennsylvania Health System, Philadelphia, Pennsylvania, 2014
University of South Carolina, Darla Moore School of Business, Columbia, South Carolina, 2014
125 Greenwich Street, New York, 2015-2019
The New Stanford Hospital, Stanford, California, 2015
1401 Spruce Street, Philadelphia, Pennsylvania, 2015
Manchester City Football Club, Etihad Campus, 2012-2016
 281 Fifth Avenue, a skyscraper in New York City
 NEMA Chicago, Chicago, Illinois, 2019

References

Vinoly, Rafael